is a football (soccer) club based in Onagawa, the main and only city forming the Oshika District, which is located in Miyagi Prefecture in Japan. They play in the Tohoku Soccer League, which is part of Japanese Regional Leagues. The name Cobaltore comes from the combination of two Spanish words: cobalto, referring to cobalt blue, and floresta, meaning "forest".

History
Born in April 2006 and initially managed by former Japan NT member Nobuo Fujishima, the name of the club resembles the true nature of the region in Miyagi Prefecture and today Cobaltore is still one of the clubs aiming to J. League and professional football. It was founded by the local community, formed by people who wanted to stay in the city instead of leaving for Sendai or Tokyo. The club rapidly grew, climbing the Japanese football pyramid in five years.

The 2011 Tohoku earthquake was devastating both for the region and the club: Onagawa lost 1300 citizens, one tenth of the city's population, and the club's office was destroyed. However, all players escaped death and many of them became the core of the club.

Despite the strong shock and skipping the 2011 season due to damages and the impossibility of using their own stadium, which was used as a shelter, Cobaltore players - especially the Japanese - remained in town to give a hand to the city that hosted their careers. The group of Onagawa Supporters pushed back the club into the pitch and - for 2012 season - Cobaltore returned on the field.

Thanks to Fukushima United FC going to Japan Football League, Cobaltore joined Tohoku Soccer League first division for 2013 season. From then, Cobaltore is trying to reach JFL, aiming towards pro-football. They also won the division in 2016. After repeating the title in 2017 and winning the Regional Promotion Series, they were promoted to JFL but only lasted one season before going back down.

Current squad
Updated as of 14 October 2022.

League record

Honours
Regional Champions League
Champions (1): 2017
Tohoku Soccer League
Champions (4): 2016, 2017, 2021, 2022

Stadium

References

External links
Official Site (Japanese)
Official Facebook Page
Official Twitter Account
Academy's website
Onagawa Supporters' Twitter

 
Football clubs in Japan
Sports teams in Miyagi Prefecture
Onagawa, Miyagi
Association football clubs established in 2006
2006 establishments in Japan
Japan Football League clubs